Tut Kaleh, also rendered as Tut Kala, may refer to:
 Tut Kaleh-ye Olya
 Tut Kaleh-ye Sofla